Otoyol 51, abbreviated as O-51, aka Adana-Erdemli Otoyolu, is a toll motorway in the Mediterranean Region of Turkey, connecting the cities Adana and Mersin. The motorway is on its full length of  part of international routes as of European routes E90 and E982 and Asian Highway 84.

The motorway starts from the western terminus of O-52 in Central Adana, runs westward reaching the south terminus of Pozantı-Adana Motorway O-21 northeast of Tarsus, continues southwest to Mersin bypassing it at north and terminates in Erdemli.

There are plans to extend the motorway to Silifke.

Exit list

Light blue indicates toll section of motorway.

See also
 List of highways in Turkey

References

 Turkish General Directorate of Highways. Turkey road map
List of exits on O-51

51
Transport in Adana Province
Transport in Mersin Province
Toll roads in Turkey